Major General Zarif Sharifzoda (Russian and Tajik: Зариф Шарифзода) was a Tajik general who was the former Chief of the General Staff of the Armed Forces of the Republic of Tajikistan.

Biography
He was born Zarif Tairovich Bobokalonov on November 3, 1970, in Soviet Tajikistan. His military career first took off in the early 2000s, when he was appointed as Deputy Chief of the General Staff. On top of that, in 2010, Sharifzoda was made the Head of the Operational Directorate of the General Staff of Tajikistan, a position he would serve in for 2 years before leaving the country in 2012 to go and study at Russia's general staff academy in Moscow. On January 18, 2014, President Emomali Rahmon appointed him as his Chief of the General Staff, overseeing all four military branches of the armed forces. That same year, he changed his name from his family name, Bobokalonov, to Sharifzoda, which was a result of Rahmons's efforts to de-Russification the country's culture. He was dismissed from his role on November 24, 2015, being replaced by General Emomali Sobirzoda. 

He was killed in a car accident in the center of Dushanbe on January 18, 2017, when he was returning home after work and made a collision with another car. Sharifzoda died immediately after the accident took place.

See also
 Chief of the General Staff (Tajikistan)
 Ministry of Defence (Tajikistan)
 Armed Forces of the Republic of Tajikistan

References

1970 births
2017 deaths
Tajikistani generals
Chiefs of the General Staff (Tajikistan)